Djupedalen Valley is a glacier-filled valley separating the Mühlig-Hofmann Mountains and the Filchner Mountains in Queen Maud Land. It was plotted from surveys and air photos by the Sixth Norwegian Antarctic Expedition (1956–60) and named Djupedalen (the deep valley).

See also 
Djupedalsleitet Saddle

References 

Valleys of Queen Maud Land
Princess Astrid Coast